Francis Little (February 23, 1822January 6, 1890) was an Irish American immigrant, Wisconsin pioneer, and Republican politician.  He was a member of the Wisconsin State Senate (1871–1875) and State Assembly (1864 & 1865), representing Iowa County.

Biography
Little was born in County Fermanagh, Ireland (in what is now Northern Ireland) on February 23, 1822.  He received a common school education in Ireland and emigrated to the United States in 1842, staying for a year at the home of his brothers in Mercer County, Illinois.

In 1844, he moved north into the Wisconsin Territory and settled at New Diggings, where he worked in the smelting shop of Stole & Leakley for four years.  He then used his earnings to purchase a half-stake in a new general merchandise business with Leakley.  After four years of that business, he parlayed his earnings to purchase 320 acres of land in what is now the town of Linden, including the historic site of Fort Washington, which had been utilized in the Black Hawk War.  He went on to serve at least four terms as chairman of the town board of supervisors (1858–1862).  (Records before 1858 are incomplete.)

He also served three years on the county board of supervisors and six years as county superintendent of the poor.  Politically, he was a stalwart Republican and was elected to two consecutive terms in the Wisconsin State Assembly from Iowa County's southern district, serving in the 1864 and 1865 sessions.  He was elected in 1870 to represent all of Iowa County in the Wisconsin State Senate, and was subsequently re-elected in 1872.

He was active in the Iowa County Agricultural Society, and served as a vice president of the organization in 1863.  He was also involved with the Southwestern Wisconsin Industrial Association, serving on the board of that organization in 1879.

Little died on January 6, 1890, at his home in Linden, Wisconsin, and was buried in Mineral Point, Wisconsin.

Personal life and family

In 1851, Little married English American immigrant Susana Fawcett.  They had ten children together, though three died in childhood.

Electoral history

Wisconsin Senate (1870)

| colspan="6" style="text-align:center;background-color: #e9e9e9;"| General Election, November 8, 1870

Wisconsin Senate (1872)

| colspan="6" style="text-align:center;background-color: #e9e9e9;"| General Election, November 5, 1872

References

See also

People from County Fermanagh
Irish emigrants to the United States (before 1923)
People from Mercer County, Illinois
People from New Diggings, Wisconsin
People from Mineral Point, Wisconsin
County supervisors in Wisconsin
Wisconsin city council members
Republican Party Wisconsin state senators
Republican Party members of the Wisconsin State Assembly
1822 births
1890 deaths
Burials in Wisconsin
19th-century American politicians